General elections were held in Pakistan on 10 October 2002 to elect the 12th National Assembly and four Provincial Assemblies. The elections were held under the military government of Pervez Musharraf. The two mainstream parties, Pakistan Peoples Party (PPP) and Pakistan Muslim League (N) (PML-N) had several restrictions imposed on them and their leaders Benazir Bhutto and Nawaz Sharif were in exile. In order to address the restrictions, PPP created the Pakistan Peoples Party Parliamentarians (PPPP) under the leadership of Ameen Faheem, to contest the elections on its behalf. The PML-N meanwhile, suffering from the party's division into two factions: one that remained loyal to Sharif and were contesting the elections under the leadership of Javed Hashmi, and the other which had broken away to form the pro-Musharraf Pakistan Muslim League (Q) (PML-Q) under the leadership of Mian Muhammad Azhar. The emergence of the PML-Q marked the beginning of multi-party politics in the country, bringing an end to the decade-long two-party system between the PPP and PML-N.

The newly formed PML-Q - referred to as King's party due to President Musharraf's support - won the highest number of seats in the National Assembly. Despite the absence of Benazir Bhutto, PPPP came at a close second, and actually dominated in terms of popular vote. In opposition to the liberal regime of Musharraf, Islamist parties had organised themselves into the right-wing alliance Muttahida Majlis-e-Amal (MMA) prior to elections. The MMA ended up becoming the third largest party in National Assembly. PML-N suffering from Nawaz Sharif's absence and party split, finished fourth.  At the provincial level, PPPP emerged as the largest party in Sindh, PML-Q was triumphant in Punjab, whereas MMA won the most seats in NWFP and Balochistan. With help of other pro-Musharraf parties such as MQM and National Alliance, PML-Q formed a government not only in the Centre but also in all provinces besides NWFP. Since Mian Muhammad Azhar had failed to win a seat himself, PML-Q and its allies agreed on the appointment of Zafarullah Jamali as the next Prime Minister

Background
Following the 1999 Pakistani coup d'état, Nawaz Sharif was removed as Prime Minister of Pakistan and Pervez Musharraf assumed control of the executive branch of the Government of Pakistan. In 2000, the Supreme Court ruled that the coup was legal although had to be legitimised by an election. A referendum was held earlier in 2002 to bring legitimacy to Musharraf's presidency, despite being boycotted by the opposition.

Parties and candidates
More than 70 parties contested the elections. The main parties were the Pakistan Peoples Party Parliamentarians (PPPP), Pakistan Muslim League (Nawaz), Muttahida Quami Movement (MQM), Pakistan Muslim League (Quaid-e-Azam), which was also called the "King's Party" for its unconditional support of the government, and the Muttahida Majlis-e-Amal (MMA), an alliance of six religious political parties.

Other known parties contesting at the national level included the six-party National Alliance led by former President Farooq Leghari, Imran Khan's Pakistan Tehreek-e-Insaf and Tahir-ul-Qadri's Pakistan Awami Tehreek.

Results
In the National Assembly elections, the PPPP received the most votes but the PML-Q won the most seats, winning 126 to the PPPP's 81. At the provincial level, the MMA emerged as the largest party in Balochistan and North-West Frontier Province. The PML-N lost its stronghold of Punjab to the PML-Q, while in Sindh there was a hung parliament, with the PPP winning more seats than the National Alliance. Voter turnout was 41.8%.

Although the founder of the PML-Q Mian Muhammad Azhar was considered the most likely candidate to become Prime Minister, he failed to win a seat in the National Assembly. Instead a senior party leader Zafarullah Khan Jamali was tasked with leading the new government. Meanwhile, the MMA leader Fazal-ur-Rehman became the Leader of the Opposition.

National Assembly

Provincial Assemblies

Punjab

Sindh

North-West Frontier Province

Balochistan

Election for Prime Minister
The election for Prime Minister took place on 21 November 2002.

References 

2002
Gen
October 2002 events in Pakistan